This page includes a list of biblical proper names that start with K in English transcription. Some of the names are given with a proposed etymological meaning. For further information on the names included on the list, the reader may consult the sources listed below in the References and External Links.

A – B – C – D – E – F – G – H – I – J – K – L – M – N – O – P – Q – R – S – T – U – V – Y – Z

K 

Kabzeel
Kadesh
Kadmiel
Kadmonites
Kallai
Kamon
Kanah
Kareah
Karkaa
Karkor
Kartah
Kedar
Kedemah
Kedemoth
Keilah
Kelaiah
Kelita
Kemuel
Kenah
Kenan
Kenaz
Kenites
Kenizzites
Keren-happuch
Kerioth
Keros
Keturah
Kezia
Keziz
Kibroth-hattaavah
Kibzaim
Kidron
Kinah
Kir
Kir-haraseth
Kiriath-baal
Kirioth
Kirjath
Kirjathaim
Kirjath-arba
Kirjath-arim
Kirjath-huzoth
Kirjath-jearim
Kirjath-sannah
Kirjath-sepher
Kish
Kishi
Kishion
Kishon
Kithlish
Kitron
Kittim
Koa
Kohath
Kolaiah
Korah
Kushaiah

References
Comay, Joan, Who's Who in the Old Testament, Oxford University Press, 1971,  
Lockyer, Herbert, All the men of the Bible, Zondervan Publishing House (Grand Rapids, Michigan), 1958
Lockyer, Herbert, All the women of the Bible, Zondervan Publishing 1988, 
Lockyer, Herbert, All the Divine Names and Titles in the Bible, Zondervan Publishing 1988,  
Tischler, Nancy M., All things in the Bible: an encyclopedia of the biblical world , Greenwood Publishing, Westport, Conn. : 2006

Inline references 

K